Largo Bay is a bay on the northern shore of the Firth of Forth, on the coast of Fife, Scotland.

Lower Largo is a village right on the bay, with small harbour. Upper Largo is adjacent, just inland and above the bay and at the foot of Largo Law (an extinct volcano). The Fife Coastal Path, which is a long distance footpath from Kincardine to Newburgh, runs along the side of the bay.

References

Landforms of Fife
Bays of Scotland